KXEN may refer to:

 KXEN (AM), a radio station (1010 AM) licensed to St. Louis, Missouri, United States
 KXEN Inc., a California software company